Shivpur, Shivapuri or Shivapura may refer to
 Shivpur or seepur, Mashobra Shimla
 Shivpuri or Shivapura, Madhya Pradesh
 Shibpur or Shivapura, West Bengal
 Sivapuram, Thanjavur district, Tamil Nadu
 Sivapuram, Kerala, a village in Kannur district
 Sivapuram, Tamil Nadu, a village in Thanjavur district
 Shivapuri Nagarjun National Park, just north of Kathmandu, Nepal
 Shivpur (Assembly constituency), Uttar Pradesh
 Mandhata or Shivapuri, an island in the Narmada river in Khandwa district, Madhya Pradesh, India

See also
 Shibpur (disambiguation)